South Dakota Highway 144 (SD 144) is a short highway linking the town of Akaska to  U.S. Highway 83 and SD 20. It was commissioned in 1976. This was originally the western terminus of SD 20 in the early 1950s, and became a spur of SD 20 between 1965 and 1970.

Route description
Highway 144 begins at a junction with Riley Avenue in Akaska. The road travels east from Akaska, and ends at U.S. Highway 83/South Dakota Highway 20.

Major intersections

References

External links

144
Transportation in Walworth County, South Dakota